Keith Rucker V (born November 20, 1968) is a former American football defensive tackle in the National Football League. He played for the Phoenix Cardinals (1992–1993), the Cincinnati Bengals (1994–1995), Philadelphia Eagles (1996), the Washington Redskins (1996–1997), and the Kansas City Chiefs (1997).  He finished his playing career with the San Antonio Matadors of the Spring Football League. He played college football at Eastern Michigan University and Ohio Wesleyan University.

Rucker is currently the Defensive Coordinator at Denison University.

References

External links
 Denison Profile
 Capital profile
 Ohio Wesleyan profile
 

1968 births
Living people
American football defensive tackles
Capital Comets football coaches
Cincinnati Bengals players
Eastern Michigan Eagles football players
Kansas City Chiefs players
Ohio Wesleyan Battling Bishops football coaches
Ohio Wesleyan Battling Bishops football players
Philadelphia Eagles players
Phoenix Cardinals players
Washington Redskins players
High school football coaches in Ohio
People from Shaker Heights, Ohio
People from University Park, Illinois
Players of American football from Ohio
African-American coaches of American football
African-American players of American football
21st-century African-American people
20th-century African-American sportspeople